Matuszek is a Polish surname. A possible origin is the Polonization of the Czech surname Matoušek. Notable people with this surname include:

 Gabriela Matuszek (born 1953), Polish literary historian, essayist, critic and translator of German literature
 Len Matuszek (born 1954), American baseball player
 Marek Matuszek (born 1972), Slovak judoka
 Szymon Matuszek (born 1989), Polish footballer

References 

Polish-language surnames
Surnames of Czech origin